The Hong Kong Film Award for Best Supporting Actor is an annual Hong Kong industry award presented to an actor for the best performance by an actor in a supporting role.

History
The award was established at the 4th Hong Kong Film Awards (1985) and the first winner was Shum Wai for his role in the film Long Arm of the Law. There are typically 5 or 6 nominations for the category of Best Supporting Actor from which one actor is chosen the winner of the Hong Kong Film Award for Best Supporting Actor.

The actors with most awards in this category are Tony Leung Chiu-Wai, Paul Chun, Anthony Wong Chau Sang, Liu Kai-Chi, and Eric Tsang with 2 times each. Tony Leung Chiu Wai also holds the record for the actor with the most awards in the Best Actor category.

Winners and nominees

See also
 Hong Kong Film Award
 Hong Kong Film Award for Best Actor
 Hong Kong Film Award for Best Actress
 Hong Kong Film Award for Best Supporting Actress
 Hong Kong Film Award for Best Action Choreography
 Hong Kong Film Award for Best Cinematography
 Hong Kong Film Award for Best Director
 Hong Kong Film Award for Best Film
 Hong Kong Film Award for Best New Performer

References

External links
 Hong Kong Film Awards Official Site

Film awards for supporting actor
Awards established in 1985
Hong Kong Film Awards
1985 establishments in Hong Kong